The 12571/12572 Gorakhpur - Anand Vihar Terminal Humsafar Express  is a superfast express train of the Indian Railways connecting Gorakhpur in Uttar Pradesh and Anand Vihar Terminal in Delhi to . It is currently being operated with 12571/12572 train numbers on twice weekly basis. The share it rake with Gorakhpur - Anand Vihar Terminal Humsafar Express (Via Basti). This is first Hamsafar Train.

Coach Composition 

The trains is completely 3-tier AC sleeper trains designed by Indian Railways with features of LED screen display to show information about stations, train speed etc. and will have announcement system as well, Vending machines for tea, coffee and milk, Bio toilets in compartments as well as CCTV cameras.

Service 
It averages 61 km/hr as 12571 Humsafar Express starts on Sunday and covering 839 km in 13 hrs 50 mins & 63 km/hr as 12572 Humsafar Express starts on Monday covering 839 km in 13 hrs 15 mins.

Schedule

Traction
This train hauled by WDP-4D of Gonda diesel loco shed from GKP to GD and from GD to ANVT it is hauled by Ghaziabad based WAP 7 electric locomotive vise versa.

Stoppage

See also 
 Humsafar Express
 Gorakhpur railway station
 Anand Vihar Terminal railway station
 Gorakhpur - Anand Vihar Terminal Humsafar Express (Via Basti)

Notes

References

References 
12571/Gorakhpur - Anand Vihar Terminal Humsafar Express (Via Barhni)
Vihar Terminal - Gorakhpur Humsafar Express (Via Barhni)

Passenger trains originating from Gorakhpur
Transport in Delhi
Humsafar Express trains
Rail transport in Delhi
Railway services introduced in 2016